3,4-Dehydroadipyl-CoA semialdehyde dehydrogenase (NADP+) (BoxD, 3,4-dehydroadipyl-CoA semialdehyde dehydrogenase) is an enzyme with systematic name 3,4-didehydroadipyl-CoA semialdehyde:NADP+ oxidoreductase. This enzyme catalyses the following chemical reaction

 3,4-didehydroadipyl-CoA semialdehyde + NADP+ + H2O  3,4-didehydroadipyl-CoA + NADPH + H+

This enzyme catalyses a step in the aerobic benzoyl-coenzyme A catabolic pathway in Azoarcus evansii and Burkholderia xenovorans.

References

External links 
 

EC 1.2.1